The Jelai-Bila River is a river of Central Kalimantan, Indonesia, about 600 km northeast of the capital Jakarta. Much of the land between the Lamandau River and the Jelai-Bila River is developed by agriculture.

Geography
The river flows in the central south of Borneo with predominantly tropical monsoon climate (designated as Am in the Köppen-Geiger climate classification). The annual average temperature in the area is 24 °C. The warmest month is September, when the average temperature is around 26 °C, and the coldest is January, at 20 °C. The average annual rainfall is 2760 mm. The wettest month is December, with an average of 531 mm rainfall, and the driest is September, with 45 mm rainfall.

See also
List of rivers of Indonesia
List of rivers of Kalimantan

References

Rivers of Central Kalimantan
Rivers of Indonesia